A Dream Deferred is the second studio album of Brooklyn rapper Skyzoo. The album was released on October 23, 2012. The album met with a largely positive critical response, earning 86/100 from Metacritic. It is one of Skyzoo's best charting albums, reaching No. 7 on the Top Heatseekers chart, No. 191 on the Billboard 200, No. 25 on Top R&B/Hip-Hop Albums , No. 18 on Top Rap Albums, and No. 40 on the Independent Albums chart.

Production and release
The album was originally scheduled for release on September 18, 2012, but it got pushed back to October 2, 2012.

The album's lead single "Jansport Strings" was produced by 9th Wonder and was released on August 7, 2012. Two more singles "Give It Up" and "Range Rover Rhythm" were released later.

Reception

Critical response

A Dream Deferred largely received positive reviews upon its release from contemporary music critics. At Metacritic, which assigns a normalized rating out of 100 to reviews from mainstream critics, the album received an average score of 86, which indicates "universal acclaim", based on 5 reviews. Earning 4/5 stars from HipHopDX, PopMatters gave it 8/10, Okayplayer gave it 9/10, and it earned a positive review from the hip hop publication XXL. It earned a lower score from the Canadian website Exclaim!, which gave it 6/10.

Track listing

Charts

Samples
"Jansport Strings (One Time for Chi-Ali)" contains a sample from "What Good Is A Castle" by Joe Bataan
"Pockets Full" contains a sample from "Synthetic Substitution" by Melvin Bliss
"Steel's Apartment" contains a sample from "Jupiter" by Hypnotic Brass Ensemble
"Spike Lee Was My Hero" contains a sample from "Windjammer" by Freddie Hubbard

Personnel
Credits adapted from liner notes.
 Illmind: Keyboards, Synthesizers, recording engineer, mixing 
 Godfather: Keyboards, Synths
 Illmind & The Big China Symphony: Violin, Viola, Cello, Flutes, Timpani, Fender Rhodes, Small Percussion 
 Marion "OJ" Ross: Trumpet
 Marshall Brooks: Tuba
 Nina B., Ayah, Peter Hadar, Sheila D. Yeah, John Legend, Jessy Wilson, Kay Cee: background vocals
 Chris Boehner: Mastering
 Robert Adam Mayer: Photography
 Art direction & design: Jean Goode

References

External links

2012 albums
Skyzoo albums
Albums produced by Illmind
Albums produced by 9th Wonder
Albums produced by Focus...
Albums produced by DJ Khalil
Albums produced by Best Kept Secret (production team)
Albums produced by Black Milk
Duck Down Music albums
Albums produced by Jahlil Beats